De Greep is a Dutch silent film from 1909, with a running time of eight minutes which was directed by Leon Boedels. De Greep was produced by Filmfabriek F.A. Nöggerath and is based on the French play La Griffe by Jean Sartène.

Plot
Jean-Marie Hardouin (played by Louis Bouwmeester) is an old man who once was notorious because of the iron grip he exerted on his family but now he is lame. He whiles away his days in a chair in the house of his son and daughter-in-law. He has to see how his adulterous daughter-in-law plots to murder her two foster children and her husband. Jean-Marie can't intervene and because he can't talk he can't warn his own family. Eventually he gathers all his strengths and strangles her.

See also
List of Dutch films before 1910

Sources
 Algemeen Handelsblad, 4 August 1909
 F. van der Maden, Mobiele filmvertoning in Nederland 1895–1913, Nijmegen (1981), p. 295
 Nijmeegsche Courant, 5 October 1909
 H. de Wit, Film in Utrecht van 1895 tot 1915, Utrecht (1986); Annex: p. 133
 De Kinematograaf, No. 102, 1 January 1915
 De Kinematograaf, No. 105, 22 January 1915
 De Kinematograaf, No. 121, 14 May 1915
G. Donaldson, Of Joy and Sorrow. A Filmography of Dutch Silent Fiction, Amsterdam (1997), p. 75

References

External links
The movie on the site of EYE Film Institute Netherlands
 Een leven lang theater - De Greep

1909 films
Dutch black-and-white films
Dutch silent short films